Ytterbium phosphide is an inorganic compound of ytterbium and phosphorus with the chemical formula YbP. This is one of the phosphides of ytterbium.

Synthesis
Ytterbium and phosphine reacts in liquid ammonia to form Yb(PH2)2·5NH3, which can be decomposed to obtain ytterbium phosphide:

Yb(PH2)2•5NH3 → Yb(PH2)2 + 5NH3

2Yb(PH2)2 → YbP + 2PH3 + H2

Physical properties
Ytterbium phosphide decomposes at or above 550 °C:

 12 YbP → 4 Yb3P2 + P4
It is soluble in hydrochloric acid, nitric acid, and aqua regia.

The compound forms black crystals of a cubic system, space group Fm3m.

Uses
Ytterbium phosphide compound is a semiconductor used in high power, high frequency applications and in laser and other photo diodes.

References

Phosphides
Ytterbium compounds
Semiconductors
Rock salt crystal structure